Randy L. Demmer (born January 3, 1957) is a Minnesota politician and a former member of the Minnesota House of Representatives who represented District 29A, which includes portions of Dodge and Olmsted counties in the southeastern part of the state. A Republican, he is also a local business owner, manager, and consultant.

Early life
Demmer graduated from Hayfield High School in Hayfield, then attended the University of Minnesota, earning his B.A. in agricultural business administration. He is a former 11-year board member and treasurer of the Hayfield School District.

Minnesota legislature 
Demmer was first elected in 2002, and was re-elected in 2004, 2006 and 2008. He was a member of the House's K-12 Education Policy and Oversight Committee, the Taxes Committee, and the Ways and Means Committee. He also served on the Finance subcommittees for the K-12 Education Finance Division and the Transportation Finance and Policy Division. He is currently an assistant minority leader.

Political campaigns

2008

In 2008, he unsuccessfully sought the Republican Party's endorsement to run for the United States House of Representatives in Minnesota's 1st congressional district.

2010

In December 2009, he announced that he would again seek the Republican Party's endorsement for the congressional seat in 2010, challenging incumbent Democrat Tim Walz. On April 17, 2010, he received the GOP endorsement. Also running are Independence Party nominee Steven Wilson and Party Free candidate Lars Johnson.

References

External links 

Representative Randy Demmer, official Minnesota legislature site
Randy Demmer, official campaign site
 
Campaign contributions at OpenSecrets.org
Voting record at Minnesota Public Radio Votetracker (2005–2008)

1957 births
Place of birth missing (living people)
Living people
University of Minnesota College of Food, Agricultural and Natural Resource Sciences alumni
People from Hayfield, Minnesota
Republican Party members of the Minnesota House of Representatives
American Lutherans
21st-century American politicians